Paris-New York (French: Paris New-York) is a 1940 French comedy film directed by Yves Mirande, Claude Heymann and Georges Lacombe. It stars Gaby Morlay, Michel Simon and André Lefaur. The film's sets were designed by the art director Andrej Andrejew. It was produced during the Phoney War period and released shortly before the Fall of France.

Synopsis
During an Atlantic crossing aboard a liner, a variety of passengers interact including an Inspector escorting a precious diamond, another Sûreté  officer on an investigation, several criminals, a journalist in love with the daughter of an American banker and her disapproving father whose disappearance leads to suspicions he has been murdered. In addition the diamond also goes missing on the voyage.

Cast

References

Bibliography 
 Dayna Oscherwitz & MaryEllen Higgins. The A to Z of French Cinema. Scarecrow Press, 2009.

External links 
 

1940 films
1940 comedy films
French comedy films
1940s French-language films
Films directed by Georges Lacombe
Films directed by Yves Mirande
French black-and-white films
1940s French films